Christian Frederik Hansen (29 November 1788 – 22 June 1873), was a Danish military officer who served as Minister of Defence.

Early life and career
Christian Frederik Hansen was born in Helsingør as the son of colonel Hans Chr. Hansen.

Political offices
He served as Minister of Defence in the second cabinet of Moltke from 16 November 1848 to 13 July 1851. He later served as Minister of Degence in the cabinet of Bluhme  from 27 January 1852 to 21 April 1853, then in the cabinet of  Ørsted from 21 April 1853 to 12 December 1854 and finally in the second cabinet of Bluhme 11 July 1864 to 6 November 1865.

Awards
He was appointed to general à la suite at the end of his political career. He received the Order of the Elephant in 1865.

References

Danish Defence Ministers
People from Helsingør
1788 births
1873 deaths